Sisaket Volleyball Club is a male professional volleyball team based in Sisaket, Thailand. The club plays in the Thailand league.

Honours
Thai-Denmark Super League 
  Third (2): 2015, 2016

Former names
 Krungkao (2012–2014)
 Krungkao Air Force (2014–2015)
 Sisaket-Krungkao (2015–2016)
 Sisaket (2016)

Notable players

 Teerasak Nakprasong
 Natthaya Nuangdithee
 Nattapong Kesapan
 Wattanachai Worawat
 Supachai Sriphum
 Surachet Sathongwang
 Nammon Parapa
 Santichai Pamornchat
 Montri Vaenpradab
 Prasit Piladuang
 Tanarak Ruensri
 Pollawat Nitkamhan
 Phanuwat Janta
 Sutut Meekaew 
 Wittaya Termsak
 Anuchit Pakdeekaew
 Ammart Suphannawong
 Artit Keawonsai
 Suttiruk Phopatee
 Wuttaporn Youdong
 Weerachon Haenthaisong
 Apipong Whoktong
 Kitsada Singam
 Auttapon Sondee
 Phuwadon Sopapon
 Kitsada Chanchai

Volleyball clubs in Thailand